Round O (formerly also called Round) is an unincorporated community in Colleton County, South Carolina, United States. The population of Round O is 2,136 people. Its elevation is 36 feet (11 m). It is located near the intersection of Cottageville Highway (US 17 Alt.) and Round O Road.

According to tradition, the community received its name from a local Native American whose name was too long to pronounce, hence the name Round O, and painted his torso with a circular design.

On J. G. W. De Brahm's 1757 "Map of South Carolina and a Part of Georgia," a round geographical feature labeled "Round O Savannah" is clearly visible west of the Edisto River in St. Bartholomew's Parish.

References 

Unincorporated communities in Colleton County, South Carolina
Unincorporated communities in South Carolina